Man on a Green Bike is an Australian television film starring Grahame Bond and directed by Peter Weir, in his directorial debut.  The film premiered on ABC in 1969.

Cast
 Grahame Bond as Debauchery / Mayor of Ackley
 Peter Campbell as N/A
 John Chance as Announcer
 James Dellit as Hollywood / Mayor of Petal Lake
 Geoff Malone (as Geoffrey Malone) as Mr. Maloon
 Anna Nygh as The Woman
 Rory O'Donoghue as N/A
 Peter Weir as Technology / Mayor of Cadmium

External links
Man on a Green Bike at Internet Movie Database

Films directed by Peter Weir
1969 television films
1969 films
Australian television plays
Australian comedy television films
1969 comedy films
1960s English-language films